Steele Hall may refer to:

Persons
Steele Hall (Australian politician) (b.1928)

Buildings
Steele Hall (State University of New York at Fredonia), Fredonia, New York, USA
Steele Hall (Syracuse University), Syracuse, New York, USA, listed on the National Register of Historic Places
Steele Hall (Northern State University), residence hall in Aberdeen, South Dakota, USA
Steele Hall (Bennett College), Greensboro, North Carolina, USA, listed on the National Register of Historic Places
Steele Hall (LeMoyne-Owen College), Memphis, Tennessee, USA

See also
Steele House (disambiguation)